Fusispermum is a genus of flowering plants in the violet and pansy family Violaceae, native to Costa Rica, Panama, Columbia, Ecuador and Peru. It is basal to the other genera in Violaceae.

Species
Species currently accepted by The Plant List are as follows: 
Fusispermum laxiflorum Hekking
Fusispermum minutiflorum Cuatrec.
Fusispermum rubrolignosum Cuatrec.

References

Violaceae
Malpighiales genera